Wuta may refer to
Wuta Dombaxe (born 1986), Angolan handball player 
Wuta Mayi, recording artist, composer and vocalist from the Democratic Republic of the Congo 
Wuta Station, a railway station on the Taiwan Railway Administration 
WUTA, original designation of WMLU, a non-commercial, educational radio station licensed to Farmville, Virginia